Vinko "Vice" Vukov (3 August 1936 – 24 September 2008) was a Croatian singer and politician.

Biography
Vukov was born in Šibenik. In 1959, he achieved instant fame by winning the Opatija Music Festival in his singing debut, with the song "Mirno teku rijeke". During the 1960s, he was one of the most popular singers in Yugoslavia, appearing at the Eurovision Song Contest 1963 with the song "Brodovi" and at the Eurovision Song Contest 1965 with the song "Čežnja".

In the aftermath of the 1971 Croatian Spring movement, he was branded a Croatian nationalist by Yugoslav authorities and had his apartment searched by the police during the 1972 wave of arrests of Croatian Spring leaders. Vukov was touring Australia at the time. His wife warned him not to return to Yugoslavia to avoid arrest, so instead he went to live in France, returning to Yugoslavia four years later in 1976. By that time, the authorities had lost interest in his case, but his singing career was effectively over; he was blacklisted, barred from performing publicly and all his records were pulled out of stores.

In 1978, he graduated from the University of Zagreb's Faculty of Humanities and Social Sciences (FFZG) majoring in philosophy and Italian.

In 1989, an album of his new songs, albeit without his name on the cover, reappeared in Croatian music stores, signalling the political change. Later that same year, Vukov made a public comeback with a series of 14 sold-out concerts at the Vatroslav Lisinski Concert Hall in Zagreb.

Vukov is best remembered for recording some of the most popular lyrical Croatian patriotic songs, including "Zvona moga grada", "Hrvatski kraj" and "Tvoja zemlja".

After the first multi-party election in Croatia and the country's independence in 1991, Vukov became a prominent supporter of the opposition Social Democratic Party (SDP). He ran several times for a seat in the Croatian Parliament, finally succeeding as an independent candidate on the SDP party ticket in 2003.

On 17 November 2005, while descending the stairs in the Parliament building, Vukov slipped and fell, sustaining a serious head injury. He was hospitalised and underwent surgery, but fell into a coma shortly afterwards. In March 2006, according to his doctors, he was in a persistent vegetative state with no chance of recovery. However, in November 2007, Vukov was reported as being conscious at times, aware of his surroundings, and his condition was described as stable. He died in Zagreb in September 2008 aged 72.

References

External links
 Biography
 Preminuo Vice Vukov
 Hronika smrtne oholosti (Part 1)
 Hronika smrtne oholosti (Part 2)

1936 births
2008 deaths
Representatives in the modern Croatian Parliament
Croatian pop singers
20th-century Croatian male singers
Eurovision Song Contest entrants for Yugoslavia
Eurovision Song Contest entrants of 1963
Eurovision Song Contest entrants of 1965
Yugoslav male singers
Croatian columnists
People from Šibenik
Social Democratic Party of Croatia politicians
Croatian expatriates in France
Burials at Mirogoj Cemetery
Faculty of Humanities and Social Sciences, University of Zagreb alumni